The MLB London Series is an arrangement for Major League Baseball (MLB) to play select regular season games at London Stadium in London, England. The arrangement was initially for two years, 2019 and 2020, which was sponsored by Mitel and branded as Mitel & MLB Present London Series. The 2019 games were the first MLB contests ever played in Europe, and featured the Boston Red Sox hosting two games against the New York Yankees. Two games planned for 2020 between the St. Louis Cardinals and Chicago Cubs were cancelled due to the COVID-19 pandemic. In 2022, the arrangement between MLB and Greater London was renewed for games in 2023, 2024 and 2026.

Background

On May 8, 2018, MLB announced a two-year agreement to hold baseball games at London Stadium during the 2019 and 2020 seasons. The inaugural series was played between the Red Sox and Yankees, longtime divisional rivals.

Outside of the contiguous United States and Canada, MLB has previously held regular season games in Australia, Japan, Mexico, and Puerto Rico, and has held spring training games in China, but has never held any games in Europe. The National Football League has similarly held regular-season games in London—primarily at Wembley Stadium—under the banner of the NFL London Games. The NFL has developed a large fanbase in the United Kingdom, and as of 2018, the games at Wembley had attracted an average attendance of 85,031. The NBA has similarly held games in London as part of its Global Games series.

Kelhem Salter, MLB's director of growth and strategy in the EMEA region, noted that Europe was a "key growth market" for the league, and that Londoners were "big event-goers" and frequently sell-out events held there. Unlike the other countries where MLB has held international games, baseball is not as popular and established in the United Kingdom. Salter explained that the league wanted to differentiate its efforts in London from those of other leagues, by emphasizing a "connection to culture and the culture of the specific cities that our teams represent" to engage with new fans. In May 2018, the league began a year-long cultural program entitled "The 108" (referring to the number of stitches on a standard baseball) to promote the London games, encompassing a series of zines profiling MLB teams, as well as "The 108 Sessions" — a series of live concert events at local venues featuring acts representing the teams' cities. The campaign is designed to "build a genuine dialogue and relationship with cultural scenes that reflect those of the MLB home cities."

Series history

2019

In the 2019 series, the New York Yankees beat the Boston Red Sox in both games. The Yankees won the first game by a score of 17–13, and the second game by a score of 12–8.

2020
The 2020 series was scheduled to take place June 13–14, at London Stadium, with the St. Louis Cardinals hosting the Chicago Cubs. Due to the COVID-19 pandemic, the games were cancelled. Commissioner Rob Manfred stated that "it was unlikely the events would go forward, and timely cancellation allowed us to preserve important financial resources". The start of the 2020 season was delayed due to the pandemic, and MLB cancelled other planned games in Puerto Rico and Mexico for similar reasons.

2023, 2024 and 2026 
On May 9, 2022, commissioner Manfred and London mayor Sadiq Khan announced a long-term partnership between the league and the city that includes regular-season games in 2023, 2024 and 2026, along with other major events over the next five years. On August 4, 2022, the first matchup of the extended partnership was announced: the Cubs and Cardinals are scheduled to play a two-game series in London on June 24–25, 2023.

Venue
Locating a venue with the correct dimensions required for a baseball field was difficult, especially as the majority of stadiums in the London region are primarily designed for soccer. MLB officials had evaluated multiple options (including cricket fields such as The Oval), before finalizing London Stadium as the site.  The facility was originally constructed for the 2012 Summer Olympics; in late-2015, it was reported that MLB officials had measured the stadium's dimensions and considered it potentially suitable for baseball, and had negotiated the possibility of holding games there.

MLB developed a plan to adapt London Stadium for the games to make it resemble an MLB ballpark, via installation of a new baseball field as an overlay on top of the stadium's existing running track and pitch, with a seating configuration to emulate the more "intimate" layout and fan experiences of MLB ballparks. As the facility's locker rooms are smaller and suited towards soccer, larger, MLB-style clubhouses were built within the stadium. As done at the Toronto Blue Jays' Rogers Centre, dimensions from home plate were posted in both feet and meters:  to the foul poles and 385 feet (117.4 m) to center field, with a  fence. The dimensions were described as being potentially hitter-friendly. As the roof overhangs the home plate area, there is a ground rule that balls hitting the roof are considered dead.

Broadcasting 
In the United States, television rights for both series were split between Fox and ESPN.

In the United Kingdom, the series will be shown by the BBC until 2026.

Series summary

See also

MLB China Series
MLB Japan All-Star Series
MLB Japan Opening Series 2008
MLB Mexico Series
MLB Puerto Rico Series
MLB Taiwan All-Star Series

References

External links 
 London Series at MLB.com

 
Baseball competitions in the United Kingdom
MLB
Major League Baseball competitions
Major League Baseball international baseball competitions
MLB